Elections to Metropolitan Borough of Bermondsey were held in 1931.

The borough had 12 wards which returned between 3 and 6 members. Of the 12 wards 1 of the wards had all candidates elected unopposed.

Election result

|}

References

1931 in London
1931 English local elections
Council elections in the London Borough of Southwark
Bermondsey